Henri Dès (born 14 December 1940 in Renens, Vaud, Switzerland as Henri Destraz) is a Swiss French-language children's singer and songwriter immensely popular in European Francophone countries. In 1970, he released his first album, Retour. Dès also founded his own record label, Disques Mary-Josée, which he named after his wife.

In 1969, he won the Sopot International Song Festival.

He represented Switzerland in the 1970 Eurovision Song Contest with the song "Retour". It was placed fourth. Henri achieved another fourth place, this time in the Swiss national final for Eurovision 1976, with the song "C'est pour la vie".

On 15 March 2019 he joined striking school children in Lausanne protesting against climate change.

Discography

References

External links

Dès' official website

Sopot International Song Festival winners
Swiss singer-songwriters
Children's musicians
1940 births
Living people
Eurovision Song Contest entrants for Switzerland
Eurovision Song Contest entrants of 1970
People from the canton of Vaud